Alive and Transported is a live album by Christian hip hop artist tobyMac. It was released on May 27, 2008 and debuted at No. 112 on the Billboard 200, and also placed at No. 4 on Billboards Top Christian Albums chart. It is currently sold as a CD/DVD combo (audio tracks on the CD and videos of the live show, along with other special features, on the DVD). The live show recorded for the album was also played on Monday, June 9, 2008, in movie theaters. The film was filmed at the Richard E. Berry Educational Support Center in Cypress, Texas.

At the 51st Grammy Awards of February 2009, Alive and Transported won the Best Rock or Rap Gospel Album award. TobyMac said, "It's an honor to win my first Grammy as a solo artist. I still can't believe it, it's truly humbling. My band and I worked hard on this project and it really is the culmination of diverse people collaborating."

Track listing

 Music videos 
 "Ignition"
 "Boomin'"
 "Gone" (iTunes only)
 "The Slam"
 "Made to Love" (iTunes only)

 Artists who contributed 
 Mandisa ("Lose My Soul")
 Becca Barlow from BarlowGirl ("Jesus Freak")
 DJ Maj (every song)

Personnel
Toby "TobyMac" McKeehan - Lead Vocals
Nirva "Nirvessence" Dorsaint-Ready - Vocals
Gabriel "GabeReal" Patillo - Vocals, Trumpet, Beatbox
Deshon "Shonlock" Bullock - Vocals
Tim Rosenau - Guitars, Trumpet, Vocals
Brian "Dabomb" Haley - Drums
Dave "D-dubb" Wyatt - Keyboards, Programming, Vocals
Todd "Toddiefunk" Lawton - Bass
Mike "DJ Maj" Allen - Turntables, Tambourine
Mandisa - Vocals on Lose My Soul
Becca Barlow - Guitar on Jesus Freak

 Awards 

 Grammys 
 2009: Best Rock or Rap Gospel album of the year – Won Doves 
 2009: Long Form Music Video of the Year – Won'

Charts

Certifications

References 

TobyMac albums
2008 live albums
2008 video albums
Live video albums
Grammy Award for Best Rock or Rap Gospel Album
Christian live video albums